Duane Muckette is a Trinidadian footballer who plays as a midfielder.

Club career
After spells spending time in his native Trinidad, playing college soccer in the United States at the University of South Florida, and in Portugal with Barreirense, Muckette joined USL Championship side Memphis 901 on 8 January 2019, ahead of their inaugural season.

References

1995 births
Living people
Association football midfielders
Trinidad and Tobago footballers
Trinidad and Tobago under-20 international footballers
Trinidad and Tobago international footballers
South Florida Bulls men's soccer players
Central F.C. players
North East Stars F.C. players
F.C. Barreirense players
Memphis 901 FC players
USL Championship players
2015 CONCACAF U-20 Championship players
2021 CONCACAF Gold Cup players
Footballers at the 2015 Pan American Games